The Seequa Chameleon was an early 1980s luggable personal computer; it was capable of running both the DOS and CP/M operating systems. It did so by having both Zilog Z80 and Intel 8088 microprocessors.

While it ran MS-DOS and approximated the hardware capabilities of the IBM PC, it was highly PC compatible, being able to run such programs as Flight Simulator but was not a huge success in the market.

Seequa Computers was based in Annapolis, Maryland. It was founded by David Gardner (President) and Dave Egli (CEO), one of David's business professors at the University of Maryland. Seequa competed against the early "transportable" computers from Compaq.

See also
 Tabor Drivette - a non-standard 3.25-inch diskette drive used in the Seequa Chameleon 325

References

Portable computers
Products introduced in 1983